Louise Guthrie (October 10, 1879 – February 20, 1966) was a South African botanist and botanical artist.

Early life and education
Isobel Louise Sophie Guthrie was born in Cape Town, Cape Colony in 1879, the daughter of English-born botanist and mathematics professor Francis Guthrie and his wife, Isabella Grisbrook. She attended Rustenburg Girls High School.

Career
Louise Guthrie was a botanical assistant at the Bolus Herbarium, beginning in 1918, until 1927. While there, she developed her skill as a botanical illustrator, best known for a series of 264 depictions of protea species found in South Africa, begun in 1925, with the last dated 1947. She donated the set to Bolus Herbarium in 1948.

Personal life and legacy
The guthriae plant name honors Louise Guthrie.

Her art is archived at the University of Cape Town. The Hermanus Botanical Society held an exhibit of 76 paintings by Guthrie in 2000, at the Fernkloof Nature Reserve. Some of her watercolors are on display at South Africa House in London.

References

1879 births
1966 deaths
20th-century South African botanists
South African women botanists
South African artists
South African women artists
Place of death missing
Scientists from Cape Town
20th-century South African women scientists